The Sun Sets at Dawn is a 1950 American film noir crime film directed by Paul Sloane and starring Sally Parr and Patrick Waltz.

Plot
A young man sits in prison on the night before his execution, while his girlfriend waits for the inevitable in the prison governor's house. The warden and his wife sympathize with both of them. It is the first use of the electric chair in the state, and there are teething problems with its installation. Meanwhile, a group of reporters discussing the case, realize that the M.O. of the crime bears a similar style to that of a criminal, "Parrot" Farucco, who was supposed to have died three years previously. As the execution takes place off camera, a prison orderly collecting mail in the cafe identifies a customer as Farucco. He confronts him and is shot by the criminal, who is subdued and tied by other customers who happen to be prison officers waiting to begin work.

At the same time the reporters rush in, back from the prison to use the Post Office telephones. It turns out that the execution has had to be postponed owing to electrical problems with the chair. Farucco is brought into custody into the prison governor's office, and moved by the distraught girlfriend's grief, admits to the crime just in time to prevent the second execution attempt.

Cast
 Sally Parr as The Girl
 Philip Shawn as The Boy
 Walter Reed as The Chaplain
 Lee Fredericks as Blackie / Farucco
 Houseley Stevenson as Pops
 Howard St. John as The Warden
 Louise Lorimer as The Warden's Wife
 Raymond Bramley as The Deputy Warden
 Charles Meredith as Reporter, AP
 King Donovan as Reporter, National News Service
 Charles Arnt as Reporter, Globe Express
 Sam Edwards as Reporter, Herald
 Percy Helton as Reporter, Feature Syndicate

Reception
Film critic Dennis Schwartz wrote a mostly positive film review, "The story was well told, but the acting left a lot to be desired. And all that religious stuff thrown in, about how God listens to you, was strictly cornball. But as far as B-films go, this one is above average."

Film historian and critic Hal Erickson discussed the film's major theme. He wrote, "The Sun Sets at Dawn is a crime melodrama with strong religious overtones ... dozens of reporters gather around as The Boy tells his sad life story. While this is going on, the person who should be electrocuted is exposed, and it is suggested that a Divine force has brought about this last-minute miracle ... [and] the characters have no names; this, evidently, is meant to be symbolic."

See also
 List of films in the public domain in the United States

References

External links
 
 
 
 
 The Sun Sets at Dawn information site and DVD review at DVD Beaver (includes images)
 
  (film in public domain)

1950 crime drama films
1950 films
American crime drama films
American black-and-white films
Eagle-Lion Films films
Film noir
Films about capital punishment
Films scored by Leith Stevens
1950s prison films
Films directed by Paul Sloane
1950s English-language films
1950s American films